

Manx cattle
Manx cattle became extinct c. 1815. A description of the breed survives along with a record that the Manx people referred to them as Boaghans or Boghans (Manx words for cow include Booa and Baa).

Thomas Quayle described the Manx breed, just as they were dying out, in his 1812 General View of Agriculture in the Isle of Man:

Manx sheepdog
The Manx sheepdog was a breed of sheepdog from the Isle of Man that is now extinct. Little is known about the breed except that it had a remarkable "ability to 'hould' or separate and immobilise, any sheep which was pointed out" (W. Walter Gill).

The following extract is believed to have been written by a Ms. A. L. J. Gosset;

It continues ...

It continues ...

Manx horse
Manx horses also became extinct c. 1820–1830. Of them Thomas Quayle said,

Manx pig
The Manx pig were known to the locals as 'purrs'. They had completely died long before Thomas Quayle wrote this about them;

Other extinct species
Four species of birds that once bred on the Isle of Man have gone extinct locally; of these, the great auk is extinct worldwide. None of these animals were solely native to the Isle of Man. Several other species of mammals, such as the brown bear, wolf and Eurasian beaver, may have once been present in the Isle of Man. However, no evidence has been found of their existence.

Mammals
 Red deer
 Irish elk (extinct worldwide)

Breeding birds
 Eurasian bittern
 Black grouse
 Red grouse (re-introduced)
 Corn bunting
 Great auk (extinct worldwide)
 White-tailed eagle

Plants
 Juniper Juniperis communis, became extinct in the 20th century. It suffered a major decline after its uses for firewood and gin-making ceased. Climate change is suspected to have made the population that was left infertile. Juniper has now been reintroduced in the north of the Island by Manx Wildlife Trust.

See also

 List of extinct animals of the British Isles
 List of extinct animals of Europe

References

 W. Walter Gill, "Manx Dialect Words and Phrases". 1934.
 T. Quayle, "General View of the Agriculture of the Isle of Man". 1812.
 http://www.isle-of-man.com/manxnotebook/fulltext/tq1812/index.htmlink
 http://www.isle-of-man.com/manxnotebook/fulltext/sheep.htm

Animals in the Isle of Man
Isle of Man